Foxhall Parker Keene (December 18, 1867 – September 25, 1941) was an American thoroughbred race horse owner and breeder, a world and Olympic gold medallist in polo and an amateur tennis player. He was rated the best all-around polo player in the United States for eight consecutive years, a golfer who competed in the U.S. Open, and a pioneer racecar driver who vied for the Gordon Bennett Cup. In addition to his substantial involvement in flat racing, he was also a founding member of the National Steeplechase Association.

Biography
He was born in San Francisco, California on December 18, 1867 to Sarah Jay Daingerfield and James Robert Keene. At the time of his birth, his father was president of the San Francisco Stock Exchange. James R. Keene was also a major owner/breeder of thoroughbred racehorses and a founder of The Jockey Club from whom Foxhall Keene inherited Castleton Farm, an important breeding operation near Lexington, Kentucky.

Keene was an avid golfer who competed in the 1897 U.S. Open and who made it to the quarterfinals in the 1898 U.S. Amateur. Although he played at a high level in a number of sports, he excelled at the game of polo. A 10-goal player, he was a member of the Rockaway Hunting Club in Lawrence, Nassau County, New York, today the oldest country club in the United States. With team captain Tommy Hitchcock, in 1886 he was part of the first U.S. international polo team that competed in the inaugural International Polo Cup matches against England. He was rated the best all-around polo player in the United States for eight consecutive years and won the Gold Medal in Polo at the 1900 Summer Olympics. Following its formation, he was inducted posthumously into the Museum of Polo and Hall of Fame in 1992.

Keene also competed as a top-level tennis player, reaching the semifinals of the 1883 U.S. National Championships and the quarterfinals in 1885.

With the advent of automobile racing, Keene competed in the 1903 Gordon Bennett Cup at Athy, County Kildare, Ireland driving a Mercedes. In a race won by Camille Jenatzy, he did not finish after his car experienced axle problems.

Keene maintained a country home at Monkton, Maryland and a home in England with a stable at Melton Mowbray where he kept up to ten field hunters for fox hunting. In addition, he had a seasonal residence at Ayer's Cliff, Quebec on Lake Massawippi.

He died in poverty on September 25, 1941 at Ayer's Cliff, Quebec.

Legacy
His father named one of his horses Foxhall who won the 1882 Ascot Gold Cup in England. Recently, two Thoroughbred racehorses, one born in 1983 and another in 2002, were named after Foxhall Keene. Several publications, including The American Heritage Cookbook and Illustrated History of American Eating and Drinking and the Encyclopedia of North American Eating and Drinking Traditions, Customs and Rituals claim that Chicken à la King was prepared at Keene's suggestion.

References

External links

 Hatch, Alden and Foxhall Keene. Full Tilt. The Sporting Memoirs of Foxhall Keene. (1938) The Derrydale Press 
 Eclipse Press story of James and Foxhall Keene
 Foxhall Keene racing in his Mercedes (Vanderbilt Cup)
 Rockaway Hunting Club information on Foxhall Keene
 
 

1867 births
1941 deaths
American male equestrians
American male golfers
American male tennis players
American polo players
American racehorse owners and breeders
Golfers from San Francisco
International Polo Cup
Medalists at the 1900 Summer Olympics
Olympic gold medalists for the United States
Olympic medalists in polo
Olympic polo players of the United States
Owners of Kentucky Derby winners
People from Monkton, Maryland
Polo players at the 1900 Summer Olympics
Racing drivers from San Francisco
Tennis players from San Francisco